The R668 road is a regional road in Ireland from Lismore, County Waterford to Cahir in County Tipperary, through Clogheen and Ballylooby. The Lismore–Clogheen section is a scenic route through the Vee Gap in the Knockmealdown Mountains, between Sugarloaf Hill and Knockshanahullion.

In the eighteenth century, the Cahir–Clogheen section was part of the main road from Cashel to Cork city.  It was superseded in the early 19th century by the construction of what is now the R639 road between Cahir and Mitchelstown.  

The R665 crosses the R668 at Clogheen.  At Glentanagree Bridge, the R669 forks off to the south east past Mount Melleray to Cappoquin.

References

Roads Act 1993 (Classification of Regional Roads) Order 2006 – Department of Transport

Regional roads in the Republic of Ireland
Roads in County Tipperary
Roads in County Waterford